Lee Dong-soo (born 3 June 1994) is a South Korean footballer who plays as a defensive midfielder for Incheon United.

Career
Lee signed with Daejeon Citizen in January 2016.

References

External links 

1994 births
Living people
Association football midfielders
South Korean footballers
Daejeon Hana Citizen FC players
Jeju United FC players
Gimcheon Sangmu FC players
K League 2 players
K League 1 players